Bertram Eugene Cook (April 26, 1929 – November 24, 1998) was an American professional basketball player. Cook was selected in the 1952 NBA Draft by the New York Knicks after a collegiate career at Utah State. He played for the Knicks in 37 games during the 1954–55 season.

References

External links
 Ex-USU Star Bert Cook Voted into Utah Hall of Fame. Deseret News

1929 births
1998 deaths
American men's basketball players
Basketball players from Utah
New York Knicks draft picks
New York Knicks players
People from Weber County, Utah
Shooting guards
Utah State Aggies men's basketball players